The North American Consortium on Legal Education (NACLE) comprises 13 participating law schools in Canada, Mexico, and the United States.  The general purpose of NACLE is to promote and share understanding of the legal systems within North American countries. The specific purpose of the Consortium is to enhance the capabilities of each member to provide high quality legal education and research appropriate to the demands of the professional environment in North America.

Consortium Members
The following law schools and faculties are members of NACLE:

Canada: 
 
 University of British Columbia, Faculty of Law
 Dalhousie University, Faculty of Law
 McGill Faculty of Law
 University of Ottawa, Faculty of Law

Mexico: 
 Centro de Investigación y Docencia Económicas (CIDE)
 Instituto Tecnológico de Estudios Superiores de Monterrey (ITESM), Monterrey
 Universidad Nacional Autónoma de México (UNAM), Facultad de Derecho and Instituto de Investigaciones Jurídicas 
 Universidad Panamericana, Facultad de Derecho

United States: 
 University of Arizona, James E. Rogers College of Law
 George Washington University Law School
 University of Houston Law Center
 Southwestern Law School
 Suffolk University Law School

References

Legal education